Barry Richardson (born 5 August 1969) is an English football coach and former professional footballer who is first team goalkeeping coach at Hull City.

As a player, he was a goalkeeper who notably played in the Football League with lengthy spells at both Northampton Town and Lincoln City. He also played professionally for Scarborough, Preston North End, Mansfield Town and Doncaster Rovers before dropping into Non-League with Halifax Town and Gainsborough Trinity. Between 2004 and 2018 he was registered as a back-up player for teams he coached.

Playing career
He played for Sunderland, Seaham Red Star (loan), Scarborough, Stockport County, Northampton Town, Preston North End, Lincoln City, Mansfield Town (loan) Sheffield Wednesday (loan), Doncaster Rovers (1st spell), Gainsborough Trinity, Halifax Town, Doncaster Rovers (2nd spell), Nottingham Forest and Wycombe Wanderers.

Coaching career
Richardson has been the goalkeeping coach at Doncaster Rovers, Nottingham Forest, Cheltenham Town, Peterborough United and Wycombe Wanderers; he is currently the goalkeeping coach at Hull City.

Richardson returned to Doncaster Rovers as goalkeeping coach in the summer of 2005. On 11 January 2008 he departed Rovers to succeed David Watson as the goalkeeping coach at Nottingham Forest.

Rejoining Forest, where he had coached the academy goalkeepers in the 2004–2005 season, he was also registered as a player being allocated (in line with his age) the squad number 38. He would be an unused substitute goalkeeper on occasions for Forest, wearing the squad number 39 in the 2008–2009 season, the last time being on 3 January 2009 when Forest beat Manchester City 3–0 in the FA Cup 3rd Round. He departed the club following the appointment of Billy Davies as manager, rejecting an alternative role with the club after Davies appointed Pete Williams as goalkeeping coach.

He joined Cheltenham Town as goalkeeping coach at the start of the 2009–2010 season whilst also acting as back-up goalkeeper. He was sent off as an unused substitute in a match against Lincoln City on 14 November 2009. He parted company with the club on 21 January 2010 following the new manager Mark Yates deciding to operate without a goalkeeping coach for the remainder of the 2009–10 season.

On 3 February 2010 he signed a two and a half-year contract to become player-goalkeeping coach at Peterborough United
. He was given the number 37 shirt and appeared as an unused substitute for the game against Blackpool on 17 April 2010 due to the absence of number 1 Joe Lewis and the number 30 shirt for the match against Huddersfield in the play-off final, where again he was on the bench due to the absence of Lewis. Richardson left this role by mutual consent on 21 January 2013.

On 30 January 2014 it was reported that Richardson had signed as the goalkeeping coach for Wycombe Wanderers; he also registered as a non-contract player with the squad number 44.

During the 2014–15 season, having changed his squad number to 13, he was named as a substitute on thirty-five occasions for Wycombe but did not make a first-team appearance. At the age of 46, he played a competitive game for the first time in over 8 years on 30 January 2016, after an injury to first-choice goalkeeper Alex Lynch during a match against Plymouth Argyle, and kept a clean sheet in a 1–0 victory – the first time Plymouth had failed to score at home that season.

On 26 January 2018, Richardson was appointed goalkeeping coach for Hull City.

Notes

External links

Unofficial Barry Richardson Profile at The Forgotten Imp

1969 births
Living people
Sportspeople from Wallsend
Footballers from Tyne and Wear
English footballers
Association football goalkeepers
Sunderland A.F.C. players
Seaham Red Star F.C. players
Scarborough F.C. players
Stockport County F.C. players
Northampton Town F.C. players
Preston North End F.C. players
Lincoln City F.C. players
Mansfield Town F.C. players
Sheffield Wednesday F.C. players
Doncaster Rovers F.C. players
Halifax Town A.F.C. players
English Football League players
Nottingham Forest F.C. players
Gainsborough Trinity F.C. players
Cheltenham Town F.C. players
Wallsend Boys Club players
Peterborough United F.C. players
Wycombe Wanderers F.C. players
Doncaster Rovers F.C. non-playing staff
Nottingham Forest F.C. non-playing staff
Cheltenham Town F.C. non-playing staff
Peterborough United F.C. non-playing staff
Wycombe Wanderers F.C. non-playing staff
Hull City A.F.C. non-playing staff
Association football goalkeeping coaches